Chubby Groove is a collaborative studio album by Japanese singer Koshi Inaba, of B'z fame, and Native American musician Stevie Salas. It was released by Vermillion Records on January 18, 2017.

Overview 
The album debuted at #2 at the Japanese Oricon weekly album charts, while #2 at Top Albums Sales and #4 Hot Albums chart list by Billboard Japan. It also reached #44 at the Billboard Japan Top Albums Sales Year End 2017, and #47 at Oricon's year end chart, being certified Gold by RIAJ.

The song "Overdrive" was used in Japan in a commercial for the new Porsche Panamera and "Trophy" was the image song for the 2017 Wowow Tennis Season. "Aishi-Aisare" peaked at #62 in the Japan Hot 100 Singles chart, spending one week there.

Track listing

Personnel 
 Koshi Inaba – lead vocals, lyrics, acoustic guitar on "Sayonara River", Pow wow drums and backing vocals on "Trophy"
 Stevie Salas – guitar, music, keyboards on "Sayonara River" and "Error Message", backing vocals on tracks 8, 10 and 12, drums and percussion on "Blink" and "Trophy", pow wow drums on "Trophy"

Additional personnel 

Backing vocals
 Bernard Fowler on "Shirase" and "Nishi-Higashi"
 Luis Montalbert-Smith on tracks 8, 10 and 12
 ao on "Marie"
 Parthenon Huxley on "Blink"
 Rob Lamothe, Taylor Hawkins, Adrian Harjo and Logan Staats on "Trophy"

Additional guitars
Nard Berings on "Aishi-Aisare"
Tim Palmer on tracks 4, 6 and 10
Federico Miranda on "Blink"

Bass
 Armand Sabal-Lecco on tracks 2, 3, 6 and 7
 Shawn Davis on "Shirase" and "Marie"
 Juan Alderete on "Kunou no Hate no Sore mo Kotae no Hitotsu"
 Abel Guier on "Blink"
 Dorian Heartsong and Stuart Zender on "Trophy"

Drums and percussion
 Matt Sherrod on tracks 1, 2, 3, 6, 7, 8 and 11, Glockenspiel on "My Heart Your Heart"
 Mark Shulman on "Aishi-Aisare"
 Massimo Hernandez and Matt Sorum on "Blink"
 Taylor Hawkins on "Blink" and "Trophy", rock drums on "Trophy"
 Steve Ferrone – drums on "Shirase"
 David Leach – percussion on "Shirase"
 Denny Seiwell – percussion on "Nishi-Higashi"
 Adrian Harjo and Logan Staats – pow wow drums on "Trophy"

Keyboards
Amp Fiddler on tracks 1, 2, 6, 8 and 9
Hideyuki Terachi on "Sayonara River" and "Error Message"
Lou Pomanti on tracks 5, 7, 9, 11 and 12
Matt Sherrod on "Error Message" and "My Heart Your Heart"
Ricky Peterson on "Nishi-Hiashi"
Luis Montalbert-Smith and Tim Palmer on "Blink"

Other musicians
 Hideyuki Terachi – pre-production programming
 Nard Berings – electronic treatment on tracks 1, 3, 7 and 12, programming on "Aishi-Aisare"
 Matt Sherrod – electronic treatment on "Nishi Shigashi", programming
 Lou Pomanti – electronic treatment on "Blink"
 Jean Marie Horvat – heartbeat on "My Heart Your Heart"

Technical personnel 
 Koshi Inaba – production
 Stevie Salas – production
 Tim Palmer – mixing, engineering
 Justin Shturtz – mastering
 Alberto Oritz – engineering
 Erich Gobel – engineering
 ET Thorngren – engineering
 Hiroyuki Kobayashi – engineering
 Mark Williams – engineering
 Misha Pecheco – engineering
 Rob Lamothe – engineering
 Nard Berings – engineering
 Dorian Heartsong – engineering
 Stuart Zender – engineering
 Matt Sherrod – engineering
 Lou Pomanti – engineering

Charts

Weekly charts

Year-end charts

Certifications

References 

2017 albums
Being Inc. albums
Koshi Inaba albums
Collaborative albums